Agama etoshae, known as the Etosha agama, is a species of lizard in the family Agamidae. It is a small lizard endemic to northern Namibia and sometimes found in southern Angola. The species is believed to use sandy substrate for the construction of burrows.

References

Agama (genus)
Reptiles described in 1981
Reptiles of Namibia
Agamid lizards of Africa